The 2022–23 Thai League 3 is the sixth season of the Thai League 3, the third-tier professional league for association football clubs in Thailand, since its establishment in 2017, also known as Kongsalak Plus League due to the sponsorship deal with Kongsalak Plus. A total of 75 teams would be divided into 6 regions including 12 teams in the Northern region, 13 teams in the Northeastern region, 12 teams in the Eastern region, 12 teams in the Western region, 12 teams in the Southern region, and 14 teams in the Bangkok metropolitan region.

Regional stage
The number of teams in 6 regions including 12 teams in the Northern region, 13 teams in the Northeastern region, 12 teams in the Eastern region, 12 teams in the Western region, 12 teams in the Southern region, and 14 teams in the Bangkok metropolitan region.

Northern region

League table

Northeastern region

League table

Eastern region

League table

Western region

League table

Southern region

League table

Bangkok Metropolitan region

League table

National Championship stage

The national championship stage is the next stage from the regional stage. 1st and 2nd places of each zone qualified for this stage by being featured in 2 groups. Teams from the Northern, Northeastern, and Eastern regions would have qualified for the upper group. Meanwhile, teams from the Western, Southern, and Bangkok Metropolitan regions would have qualified for the lower group. Winners, runners-ups, and third-placed of the national championship stage would be promoted to the 2023–24 Thai League 2.

See also
 2022–23 Thai League 1
 2022–23 Thai League 2
 2022–23 Thai League 3 Northern Region
 2022–23 Thai League 3 Northeastern Region
 2022–23 Thai League 3 Eastern Region
 2022–23 Thai League 3 Western Region
 2022–23 Thai League 3 Southern Region
 2022–23 Thai League 3 Bangkok Metropolitan Region
 2022–23 Thai League 3 National Championship
 2022–23 Thai FA Cup
 2022–23 Thai League Cup
 2022 Thailand Champions Cup

References

External links
Official website of Thai League

Thai League 3
2022 in Thai football leagues
Thai